Rung Suriya ( b. 14 July 1969) is a famous Thai Luk thung singer.

Early life
He is a native of Narong Saewee, born in Bang Rakam District, Phitsanulok Province. He finished his education from Dhurakij Pundit University

Career
He entered many singing contests and often won. He debuted on stage in 1998, and was famous for his popular song, "Rak Jing Hai Ting Nang" composed by Jenpop Jobgrabuanwan. His other popular songs include "Won Pho Taksin", "Rak Nee Thee Seven", "Nam Ta Lon Bon Mue Tue", "Rak Ron Thee Don Jaedee" (etc.

His nickname is 'Gentleman of Luk thung.

Discography

Albums
 Won Pho Tak Sin (วอนพ่อตากสิน) (1997)
 Ting Nang (ติงนัง) (1998)
 Rak Nee Thee Seven (รักหนีที่เซเว่น) (1999)
 Rak Khun Dot Com (รักคุณดอตคอม) (2001)
 Choi Long Cheng (ฉ่อยหลงเฉิง) (2002)
 Phleng Rak Mue Tue (เพลงรักมือถือ) (2002)
 Manee Mekala (มณีเมขลา) (2003)
 Nam Ta Lon Bon Mue Tue (น้ำตาหล่นบนมือถือ) (2004)
 Rak Ron Thee Don Jeadee (รักรอนที่ดอนเจดีย์) (2004)
 Rak Khon Naa Lieam (รักคนหน้าเหลี่ยม) (2006)
 Pra Jan Rong Hai (พระจันทร์ร้องไห้) (2008)
 Khwam Rak Diliver (ความรักเดลิเวอร์) (2010)

TV Drama
 Sanae Luk Thung (เสน่ห์ลูกทุ่ง) (1998)
 Setthee Tien Plao (เศรษฐีตีนเปล่า) (2001)
 Hua Jai Klai Puen Tieng (หัวใจไกลปืนเที่ยง) (2002)
 Manee Mekala (มณีเมขลา) (2003)
 Lab Luang Lon (ลับลวงหลอน) (2013)
 Hang Krueang (หางเครื่อง) (2014)
 Mon Rak Phleng Phee Bok (มนต์รักเพลงผีบอก) (2015)

References

1969 births
Living people
Rung Suriya
Rung Suriya
Rung Suriya
Rung Suriya